Azbuka Vkusa, translated in English as Alphabet of Taste, is a supermarket chain founded by Maxim Koscheenko and Oleg Lytkin. The first store was opened in Moscow in 1997. As of 2015, it operated 90 stores in Moscow, Petersburg and its suburbs.

Ownership 
The founders, Maxim Koshcheenko and Oleg Lytkin control more than 50% of Gorodskoi Supermarket Ltd, a company which operates the chain. 6.9% of the company belongs to the top 14 network managers. Much of the rest of the company is in the hands of VMHY Holdings Limited, owned by the former owners of "Expobank" - Andrey Vdovin, Cyril Jakubowski, Paul and Peter Maslowski Hambro, who gradually acquired control from the other two co-founders of the network - Oleg and Sergey Vereshchagin Trykin. As of 2011 Oleg and Sergey Vereshchagin Trykin ceased being shareholders in VMHY Holdings. As of 2013 more than 12% of the network owned by the sons Paul Maslovskoye - Yuri and Alexei.

Private Labels 
Azbuka Vkusa launched their store brands in 2011.

Azbuka Vkusa has expanded steadily since 1997, balancing external acquisitions and internal growth. The table below charts that growth using figures provided courtesy of the company.

References

Supermarkets of Russia
Retail companies established in 1997
Companies based in Moscow